The 1997 season was the sixth season of independent football in Armenia following the split-up from the Soviet Union. It was the return to the summer competition format after using the winter competition format for two seasons.  The Armenian Premier League for 1997 existed of 10 teams of which the lowest ranked team would relegate to the Armenian First League and would be replaced by the champions of that league.

Premier League
 FC Dvin Artashat and FC Lori are promoted.
 FC Van Yerevan went into bankruptcy and disbanded.
 Homenmen Yerevan changed their name into Erebuni-Homenmen Yerevan.

League table

Promotion and relegation play-off

Top goalscorers

First League
 Aragats FC returned to professional football.
 FC Spitak return to professional football. 
 Zvartnots-AAL and Karabakh-2 Yerevan are introduced to the league.

League table

External links
 RSSSF: Armenia 1997